The Nokia E73 Mode is a smartphone from the Nokia Eseries range manufactured by Nokia. It is the successor to the Nokia E72. The Nokia E73 Mode is an enterprise-based smartphone (as all Nokia Eseries devices) and has standard features including mobile email, calendar and instant messaging among many others like the Nokia E72.

See also
 Nokia E72

References

Further reading
 Because the Nokia E73 Mode is a mildly-reworked version of the Nokia E72, you may read the Nokia E72 article in order to learn more about the Nokia E73 Mode.

External links
 Nokia E73: T-Mobile version vs. Mobilicity version.

Mobile phones with an integrated hardware keyboard
Nokia ESeries